This is a list of Ukrainian football transfers in the summer transfer window  2010  by club. Only transfers of the Premier League and 1st League are included.

Premier League

FC Arsenal Kyiv

In:

Out:

FC Dnipro Dnipropetrovsk

In:

Out:

FC Dynamo Kyiv

In:

Out:

FC Illichivets Mariupol

In:

Out:

FC Karpaty Lviv

In:

Out:

FC Kryvbas Kryvyi Rih

In:

Out:

FC Metalist Kharkiv

In:

Out:

FC Metalurh Donetsk

In:

Out:

FC Metalurh Zaporizhzhia

In:

Out:

FC Obolon Kyiv

In:

Out:

PFC Sevastopol

In:

Out:

FC Shakhtar Donetsk

In:

Out:

SC Tavriya Simferopol

In:

Out:

FC Volyn Lutsk

In:

Out:

FC Vorskla Poltava

In:

Out:

FC Zorya Luhansk

In:

Out:

First League

FC Arsenal Bila Tserkva

In:

Out:

FC Bukovyna Chernivtsi

In:

Out:

FC Chornomorets Odessa

In:

Out:

FC Desna Chernihiv

In:

Out:

FC Dniester Ovidiopol

In:

Out:

FC Dynamo-2 Kyiv

In:

Out:

FC Enerhetyk Burshtyn

In:

Out:

FC Feniks-Illychovets Kalinine

In:

Out:

FC Helios Kharkiv

In:

Out:

FC Ihroservice Simferopol

In:

Out:

FC Krymteplitsia Molodizhne

In:

Out:

FC Lviv

In:

Out:

FC Naftovyk-Ukrnafta Okhtyrka

In:

Out:

PFC Olexandria

In:

Out:

FSC Prykarpattya Ivano-Frankivsk

In:

Out:

FC Stal Alchevsk

In:

Out:

FC Tytan Armiansk

In:

Out:

FC Zakarpattia Uzhhorod

In:

Out:

See also
Ukrainian Premier League 2010-11
Ukrainian First League 2010-11

References

External links
 Ukrainian Football Premier League- official site
 Professional football league of Ukraine - official site
 Football Federation of Ukraine - official site
 Ukrainian Soccer Fan Club (ukrainiansoccer.net) - amateur's site
 UA:Football:News. Ukrainian Football

Ukrainian
Transfers
2010